Edward William Bradley Jr. (born April 22, 1950) is a former professional American football player who played in seven National Football League (NFL) seasons from 1972-1978 for the Pittsburgh Steelers, the Seattle Seahawks and the San Francisco 49ers. Since 1995, Bradley has served as the color commentator for Wake Forest University football radio broadcasts. Bradley's father, Ed Bradley, also played at Wake Forest and professionally for the Chicago Bears. Bradley was inducted into the Wake Forest Sports Hall of Fame in 1987.

References

1950 births
Living people
American football linebackers
College football announcers
Pittsburgh Steelers players
San Francisco 49ers players
Seattle Seahawks players
Wake Forest Demon Deacons football players
Sportspeople from Bridgeport, Connecticut
Players of American football from Connecticut